The Universidad de Sucre (Unisucre) is a public, departmental, coeducational university located in Sincelejo, Sucre, Colombia. The university has three campuses in the city.  The main one, known as the Puerta Roja is the home for most of the faculties and has the largest student population.  The second and smaller campus, known as Puerta Blanca, is home to the Faculty of Health Sciences and it's near the University Hospital of Sincelejo.  The third campus, known as Puerta Verde or the Granja Pericos is home to the Faculty of Agronomy Sciences and is in the outskirts of the city. The university offers education at undergraduate and postgraduate levels, with 16 academic programs across its five faculties.

Campus

Library
The "Pompeyo Molina" Library, which is an integral part of the university, is the biggest in Sincelejo and the department of Sucre. In 2004, the new facility was opened to the public and included 14,047 books and 39 magazine titles.

Academics

Unisucre has 12 undergraduate programs across four academic departments:

See also

List of universities in Colombia

Notes

External links
University of Sucre University's Official site 

Universities and colleges in Colombia
Educational institutions established in 1977
1977 establishments in Colombia